The War of the Cities began as a war between the Swabian League of Cities and the Bavarian dukes 1387−1389. It evolved into a war of influence between the nobility and free cities.

Background
The Free imperial cities in the south of the Holy Roman Empire aimed towards defending their liberties against the territorial expanding states of Bavaria, Austria and Württemberg. The trigger for the war was a pact between the Swabian League of Cities and the archbishop of Salzburg, Pilgrim von Puchheim, both antagonists of Bavaria. This pact would have surrounded Bavaria from two sides. Bavaria took the Bishop captive and demanded the dissolution of the pact. German king Wenceslaus IV of Bohemia declared a Reichskrieg (ger. war of the realm) against Bavaria.

Aftermath 
Originating from a regional conflict, the war developed into a decision of the future role of king, nobility and cities in the Holy Roman Empire. 

After three years of brutal war, which included south Germany in its entirety, the war ended with the Landfrieden of Eger on 5. May 1389 at the expense of the cities. The Swabian League of Cities was forbidden and dissolved. The cities had to pay war reparations and take other drawbacks. The conflicts couldn't be settled by this unjust peace and 1390 a new league of cities was founded.

Footnotes

External links
 Alexander Schubert: Städtekrieg 1387/1389, Historisches Lexikon Bayerns (in German)

History of Swabia
1380s conflicts
1380s in the Holy Roman Empire
Wars involving Bavaria